The 2017 Benue State flooding took place in September 2017 in Benue State, Nigeria. It displaced at least 100,000 people, and damaged more than 2,000 homes.

Causes

Weeks of rainfall led to flash floods, discharges and river overflowing in Benue State in north-central Nigeria. 21 out of 23 local government areas in Benue are affected. Flooding in the area is common due to heavy rains and the Benue River flowing through the area.

Effects on climate change
The flooding was similar to the severe one in 2012. The flood submerged two major bridges on River Guma at Tor Kpande and Mande Ortom. Farmlands and food barns were also destroyed in the affected communities. The newly constructed Daudu-Gbajimba, and University of Agriculture Makurdi roads, were not spared as they became impassable after several portions of the roads were washed away by the rising flood waters. Agriculture in Benue faces several challenges which threaten the future of agriculture. Rainfall intensity seemed to be increasing with a gradual reduction. The average discharge at Makurdi hydrological station was 3468.24 m³s⁻¹, and the highest peak flow discharge was 16,400 m³s⁻¹. The daily maximum temperature and annual average temperature are gradually rising, leading to increased heat. Analysis  showed that the soils are moderately fertile but require effective application of inorganic and organic fertilisers. The main occupational activities in the area are based on agriculture.

References

2017 floods in Africa
Benue State
Floods in Nigeria
August 2017 events in Nigeria
September 2017 events in Nigeria
2017 disasters in Nigeria

Climate change in Africa